Copley Township may refer to the following townships in the United States:

 Copley Township, Knox County, Illinois
 Copley Township, Clearwater County, Minnesota
 Copley Township, Summit County, Ohio